
Gmina Kluczewsko is a rural gmina (administrative district) in Włoszczowa County, Świętokrzyskie Voivodeship, in south-central Poland.

The gmina contains part of the protected area called Przedbórz Landscape Park.

Villages
Gmina Kluczewsko contains the villages and settlements of Bobrowniki, Bobrowska Wola, Boża Wola, Brzeście, Ciemiętniki, Dąbrowy, Dobromierz, Jakubowice, Januszewice, Jeżowiec, Kąparzów, Kluczewsko, Kolonia Bobrowska Wola, Kolonia Łapczyna Wola, Komorniki, Łapczyna Wola, Miedziana Góra, Mrowina, Mrowina-Kolonia, Nowiny, Pilczyca, Pilczyca-Kolonia, Praczka, Rączki, Rzewuszyce, Stanowiska, Zabrodzie, Zalesie and Zmarłe.

Neighbouring gminas
Gmina Kluczewsko is bordered by the gminas of Krasocin, Przedbórz, Wielgomłyny, Włoszczowa and Żytno.

References
Polish official population figures 2006

Kluczewsko
Włoszczowa County